Vegoose was an annual Halloween music and arts festival that took place in 2005, 2006, and 2007 in Las Vegas, Nevada. Unlike the Bonnaroo Music Festival — put on by the same organizers, Superfly Productions and AC Entertainment — Vegoose does not offer on-site camping. In addition to music, the festival features a score of activities, including celebrity impersonators, a wedding chapel, costume contests, a massive pumpkin display, and more.

The festival's current state is in question and did not make a return in 2008. However, the festival may make its return in the near future. A.C. Entertainment and Superfly instead focused their energy on a new festival in San Francisco, the Outside Lands Festival.

Vegoose 2007
The third annual installment of this dynamic entertainment experience took place in Las Vegas over Halloween weekend at Sam Boyd Stadium on Saturday, October 27 and Sunday, October 28. 'Vegoose at Night,' a series of nighttime concerts, presented a variety of artists at marquee venues throughout the city starting on Friday, October 26 and running through Sunday, October 28. The popularity of the event directly affected Vegoose's future. After a decline in attendance in 2006, AC stated in the Las Vegas Review Journal that there had to be an improvement. The official attendance was 40,000 for both days (32,000 in 2006). Executive Producer: Stephen Warner, Directed by: Keith Hobelman.

Line up

Rage Against the Machine
Daft Punk
Iggy & the Stooges performing the album Fun House
Muse
The Shins
Cypress Hill
Queens of the Stone Age
moe.
Public Enemy
Michael Franti & Spearhead
Sound Tribe Sector 9
Umphrey's McGee
Thievery Corporation
M.I.A.
Mastodon
Robert Randolph and the Family Band
Ghostface Killah & The Rhythm Roots Allstars
Blonde Redhead
Gogol Bordello
U.N.K.L.E.
Ghostland Observatory
Pharoahe Monch
Battles
Lupe Fiasco
Animal Liberation Orchestra
Atmosphere
Infected Mushroom
Federico Aubele

Vegoose at Night:

 Thievery Corporation
Friday, Oct 26th
House of Blues

moe.
Friday, October 26
The Joint

Umphrey's McGee
Saturday, Oct 27th
House of Blues

Michael Franti & Spearhead
Saturday, Oct 27th
The Joint  Hard Rock

Sound Tribe Sector 9
Sunday, Oct 28th
House of Blues
Doors 11PM / Show 12AM

The Shins
Sunday, Oct 28th
The Joint  Hard Rock

Vegoose 2006
The 2006 festival took place from October 27 to the October 31.

2006 artist lineup

Sam Boyd Stadium

Tom Petty and the Heartbreakers
Phil Lesh & Trey Anastasio...
Widespread Panic
The Coup
The Killers
The Mars Volta
The Keller Williams Incident featuring Keller Williams backed by The String Cheese Incident
The Black Crowes
Fiona Apple
The Raconteurs
Ben Folds
Damian "Jr. Gong" Marley
Medeski Martin & Wood
The Roots
The Rhythm Devils ft. Mickey Hart, Bill Kreutzmann, Jen Durkin, Mike Gordon & Steve Kimock
G. Love & Special Sauce
Jurassic 5
Galactic
Praxis
Yonder Mountain String Band
Gomez
Built to Spill
Guster
Jim James of My Morning Jacket
Mike Patton's Peeping Tom - Cancelled 9/14
Dr. Octagon aka Kool Keith
Band of Horses
Jamie Lidell
The Yard Dogs Road Show
Cat Power and the Memphis Rhythm Band
Jenny Lewis with the Watson Twins

Vegoose at Night:

An Acoustic Evening with Dave Matthews & Tim Reynolds - Friday at MGM Grand Garden
Damian "Jr. Gong" Marley - Friday at The Joint - Hard Rock
Keller Williams - Friday at House of Blues
Trey Anastasio w/ Robert Randolph & The Family Band - Friday at Orleans Arena
Maceo Parker with special guest Prince - Saturday at House of Blues
Sound Tribe Sector 9 - Saturday at The Joint - Hard Rock
Phil Lesh & Trey Anastasio - Saturday at Orleans Arena
The String Cheese Incident - Sunday at Orleans Arena
Widespread Panic w/ The Meters - Monday at MGM Grand Garden

Vegoose 2005
Held October 29 and October 30, 2005 at various venues, primarily Sam Boyd Stadium. Other venues included the House of Blues, The Joint at the Hard Rock Hotel and Casino, Aladdin Theatre for the Performing Arts, and Orleans Arena.

2005 artist lineup
Sam Boyd Stadium

Dave Matthews & Friends
Widespread Panic
Jack Johnson
Beck
Phil Lesh & Friends
The Meters
Trey Anastasio
Arcade Fire
The Flaming Lips
The String Cheese Incident
Primus
Ween
The Shins
moe.
Spoon
Talib Kweli
Sleater-Kinney
Gov't Mule
Digable Planets
North Mississippi Allstars
Michael Franti & Spearhead
The Decemberists
Umphrey's McGee
Atmosphere
Blackalicious
The Magic Numbers
Lyrics Born
Devendra Banhart
ALO
The Codetalkers featuring Col. Bruce Hampton
Beans with Holy Fuck
King Britt Presents: Sister Gertrude Morgan
Steel Train
Blue Man Group

Vegoose at Night

Dave Matthews & Tim Reynolds
Widespread Panic featuring The Dirty Dozen Brass Band Horns
Phil Lesh & Friends
Trey Anastasio
The String Cheese Incident
Umphrey's McGee
Robert Randolph and the Family Band
Ween
Galactic
moe.
STS9
Gov't Mule

See also
List of jam band music festivals

References

External links

Official Vegoose Website
Official Vegoose MySpace Site
Spin Magazine article on Vegoose 2006
Rolling Stone Magazine article on Vegoose 2005
Las Vegas Review Journal article on Vegoose
Vegoose Videos
Ice Cream Man's review of 2006 Vegoose
Vegoose Photos

Las Vegas Valley
Rock festivals in the United States
Jam band festivals
Music festivals established in 2005
Music festivals in Nevada